UW Medical School may refer to:

University of Washington School of Medicine
University of Wisconsin School of Medicine and Public Health